Chahar Suq (also Romanized as Chahār Sūq and Chehār Suq; also known as Chowr Sokh) is a village in Shirin Su Rural District, Shirin Su District, Kabudarahang County, Hamadan Province, Iran. At the 2006 census, its population was 539, in 109 families.

References 

Populated places in Kabudarahang County